Nana Yaa, better known by her stage name Nayaah, is a Ghanaian Gospel singer and songwriter based in Luton, United Kingdom.

Early life
She began singing when she was 10 years old in Accra, Ghana and has toured Ghana and Nigeria extensively.

Awards and nominations

Discography

Albums

Singles

References

External links
Official Facebook Page

Living people
Musicians from Accra
Ghanaian women singers
Ghanaian gospel singers
Year of birth missing (living people)
People from Luton